William Price (born October 11, 1994) is an American football center for the Arizona Cardinals of the National Football League (NFL). He played college football at Ohio State and was drafted by the Cincinnati Bengals in the first round of the 2018 NFL Draft.

High school career 
Price attended Fitch High School in Austintown, Ohio, were he played defensive line. In 2012, as a senior, Price earned First-team All-State and Division I Co-Defensive Player of the Year in Ohio (AP). In his sophomore, junior and senior seasons, Price helped his Fitch team earn playoff berths.

In high school, Price also competed in the discus and shotput on Fitch's track and field team.

College career
A 4-star recruit, Price committed to Ohio State over offers from Michigan, Nebraska, Notre Dame, Tennessee, and UCLA, among others. In 2013, Price redshirted his freshman season before going on to start all 55 games from 2014 to 2017, breaking the previous OSU school records for starts and consecutive starts of 50.

As a redshirt freshman starting at guard, Price helped Ohio State to the national championship.

Price played his first three seasons at offensive guard before moving to center for his senior season.

As a senior with the Ohio State Buckeyes in 2017, Price won the Rimington Trophy as the best collegiate center, earned First-team All-Big Ten honors, and was also named a unanimous All-American.

In 2016 and 2017, Price was elected team captain.

Professional career

Cincinnati Bengals

Price was drafted by the Cincinnati Bengals with the 21st overall pick in the first round of the 2018 NFL Draft. The Bengals acquired the pick from the Buffalo Bills along with Cordy Glenn in an offseason trade. He started the first two games at center before missing the next six games with a foot injury. He returned in Week 10 and remained the starter the rest of the season.

On April 28, 2021, the Bengals declined the option on Price's contract, making him a free agent in 2022.

New York Giants
On August 30, 2021, Price was traded to the New York Giants in exchange for defensive tackle B. J. Hill. Price started in 15 games in 2021 allowing 24 quarterback pressures and two sacks, the total pressures being the fourth most by a Giants offensive lineman.

Las Vegas Raiders
On September 14, 2022, Price signed with the Las Vegas Raiders to the practice squad.

Arizona Cardinals
On October 4, 2022, the Arizona Cardinals signed Price off the Raiders practice squad. Price was named the starting center for Week 7 after Rodney Hudson injured his knee.

Personal life 
At Ohio State, Price majored in Business Administration with a specialization in Operations Management. In college, Price earned Academic All-Big Ten Conference honors (2014 and 2017) and OSU Scholar-Athlete honors (2013 and 2014) twice each. He is married to wife, Taylor. On December 31, 2021, his wife suffered a miscarriage.

References

External links
Cincinnati Bengals bio
Ohio State Buckeyes bio

1994 births
Living people
Players of American football from Ohio
American football offensive guards
American football centers
Ohio State Buckeyes football players
All-American college football players
Cincinnati Bengals players
People from Austintown, Ohio
New York Giants players
Las Vegas Raiders players
Arizona Cardinals players